The Alster-Schwimmhalle is one of Germany's larger aquatics centers, located in the Hamburg district of Hohenfelde. Opened in 1973, it has regularly hosted various national and international swimming competitions.

The Alster-Schwimmhalle is notable for its  by  double hyperbolic-paraboloid concrete-shell roof structure, designed by Jörg Schlaich, then partner at Stuttgart-based engineering firm Leonhardt & Andrä. Resting on three bearings and only  thin, the concrete roof remains one the world's largest of its kind. Reminiscent of a butterfly –an allegory to its function as a swimming venue– the airy roof structure earned the Alsterschwimmhalle its nickname as "Schwimmoper" (Aquatic Opera).

The building was substantially renovated in 2007 at a cost of approx 1 mio EUR. A further major renovation is planned for 2020 to 2024 at an expected cost of 60 mio EUR, closing the facility for four years.

Facilities

References

External links

Alster-Schwimmhalle at baederland.de 
Renovation in February 2019 

Buildings and structures in Hamburg-Nord
Sports venues in Hamburg
Swimming venues in Germany
Diving venues
Sports venues completed in 1973